Diószegi is a surname of Hungarian origin. Notable people with the surname include:

 Nikolett Diószegi (born 1996), Hungarian handballer 
 Balázs Diószegi (1914–1999), Hungarian painter

Surnames of Hungarian origin